The Australia Men's national volleyball team, also known as Volleyball Team Australia Men (VTAM) or the Volleyroos, is the national volleyball team of the volleyball-playing nation of Australia. As of September 2021, they are ranked 28th in the world. They are a member of the Asian Volleyball Confederation (AVC). Their best result came in 2007, when they won the Asian Men's Volleyball Championship.

The Volleyroos made a single appearance at the FIVB World League in 1999, but the financial ramifications of the event would not see them compete again in that competition for many years History. In 2014, Australia once again joined the World League. Their final ranking was 5th out of 28 teams. In 2015 Team Ginkle, they participated again and ranked 8th out of 32 teams. Picking up wins against Italy and silver medalist Serbia, they have shown they are approaching the ability to match some of the world’s best teams.
The Australian Volleyball Federation was founded in 1963, and the sport of volleyball has rapidly increased in popularity since then, particularly in schools and recreational centers.

Tournament history
A red box around the year indicates tournaments played within Australia

Olympic Games

World Championship

World Cup

World League

Nations League

Challenger Cup

Asian Championship

Asian Cup

Current roster
The following is the Australian roster in the 2021 Asian Championships.

Head coach: Marcos Miranda

References

External links
Official website
FIVB profile

Volleyball
National men's volleyball teams
Volleyball in Australia